Zammuto is an album by The Books member Nick Zammuto, released on April 3, 2012.  It is his first release from Zammuto after ending The Books project in early 2012.

In March, he released "Too Late to Topologize" as a free download on his SoundCloud page.  The album is also streaming in full on his website.

Track listing
"Yay" - 3:39
"Groan Man, Don't Cry" - 6:01
"Idiom Wind" - 3:56
"Crabbing" - 0:37
"F U C-3PO" - 3:30
"Too Late to Topologize" - 3:38
"Zebra Butt" - 3:56
"Weird Ceiling" - 3:39
"Harlequin" - 5:49
"The Shape of Things to Come" - 4:32
"Full Fading" - 3:21

References

2012 albums